The Jawahar Sagar Dam is the third dam in the series of Chambal Valley Projects on the Chambal River, located 29 km upstream of Kota city and 26 km downstream of Rana Pratap Sagar dam. It is a concrete gravity dam, 45 meters high and 393 meters long, generating 60 MW of power with an installed capacity of 3 units of 33 MW. Its construction was completed in 1972. The dam's gross storage capacity is 67.07 million cubic meters (2.37 tmcft). The total catchment area of the dam is 27,195 km2, of which only 1,496 km2 are in Rajasthan. The free catchment area below Rana Pratap Sagar dam is 2,331 km2.
The dam is located after the Gandhi Sagar Dam and Rana Pratap Sagar Dam, but before the Kota Barrage.

Geography
It flows north-northeast through Madhya Pradesh, runs for a time through Rajasthan, then forms the boundary between Rajasthan and Madhya Pradesh before turning southeast to join the Yamuna River in the state of Uttar Pradesh.

The Chambal and its tributaries drain the Malwa region of northwestern Madhya Pradesh, while its tributary, the Banas, which rises in the Aravalli Range, drains southeastern Rajasthan. At its confluence with the Yamuna, the Chambal joins four other rivers – the Yamuna, Kwari, Sind, and Pahuj – at Pachnada near Bhareh in Uttar Pradesh, at the border of the Bhind and Etawah districts.

Construction History

The Chambal River Valley Development marked one of the landmark actions of the First Five-Year Plan launched by the Government of India in 1951, after India attained independence in August 1947. The Chambal River had not until then been used for any major developmental works, and was proposed to be developed under a joint initiative of the state governments of Madhya Pradesh and Rajasthan. The three-stage proposal, drawn up in 1953, called for three dams to provide hydroelectric power generation, and a downstream barrage to use stored waters released from the upstream dams for irrigation.

Stage I
Power generation at Gandhi Sagar Dam was through a powerhouse at the toe of the dam, with a total installed capacity of 115 MW (divided into five units of 23 MW). The Kota Barrage, an earth and masonry structure  in height, was built to provide irrigation through a canal system, with two main canals on the right and left banks. Construction of both projects began in 1953–54; both began functioning in 1960. The water received at the Kota Barrage is shared equally between Madhya Pradesh and Rajasthan for irrigation.

Stage II
In addition, a powerhouse at the toe of the dam provides an additional hydroelectric power generation capacity of 172 MW from four turbo generators, of 43 MW capacity each. The second stage was completed in 1970. The power generated at the Rana Pratap Sagar Dam is shared equally with Madhya Pradesh, as the Gandhi Sagar Dam provides the stored waters for use at this dam.

Stage III
The third and final stage of development envisaged an intermediate dam between the Rana Pratap Sagar Dam and the Kota Barrage, called the Jawahar Sagar Dam. This project was commissioned in 1972.

See also

 Jawahar Sagar Wildlife Sanctuary

References

External links
Chambal Valley Project

Hydroelectric power stations in Rajasthan
Dams in Rajasthan
Chambal River
Tourist attractions in Kota, Rajasthan
Dams completed in 1972
1972 establishments in Rajasthan
20th-century architecture in India